Notorious: Music from and Inspired by the Original Motion Picture is the official soundtrack to the 2009 biopic film Notorious based on the life and death of rapper The Notorious B.I.G. It features mostly his previously heard songs, inclusively the ones harder to find such as "Party and Bullshit" and "One More Chance (Remix)". It includes two original songs "Brooklyn Go Hard" by Jay-Z and a tribute to the rapper by Jadakiss and widow Faith Evans called "Letter to B.I.G.", as well as three unreleased demos by him and a song with Christopher "CJ" Wallace Jr., his son. "Notorious Thugs", "Notorious B.I.G.", "One More Chance (Remix)", "Brooklyn Go Hard", "Kick in the Door", "What's Beef", "The World Is Filled...", "One More Chance / The Legacy Remix" and "Love No Ho" do not feature in the movie, but are included on the album.

The album debuted at number four on the US Billboard 200, the highest debut of the week, with opening sales of 43,000. , the album has sold 124,490 copies.

Track listing
Notorious soundtrack track listing, according to Bad Boy Records:

Charts

References

External links

The Notorious B.I.G. albums
Albums produced by Kanye West
Albums produced by Easy Mo Bee
Albums produced by DJ Premier
Hip hop soundtracks
Soundtracks published posthumously
2009 soundtrack albums
Bad Boy Records soundtracks
Albums produced by Plain Pat
Biographical film soundtracks
Drama film soundtracks